Bird Island or Bird Islands may refer to:

Africa
 Bird Island (Namibia)
 Bird Island, Seychelles
Bird Island Airport
 Bird Island, Algoa Bay, South Africa
 Bird Island Nature Reserve (South Africa)

Europe
 Bird Island, County Down, a townland in Northern Ireland, UK
 Bird Island, Slovakia

North and Central America
 Bird Island, a former island in Tulare Lake
 Bird Island (Belize)
 Bird Island, Bermuda
 Bird Islands (Nunavut), Canada
 Bird Island (Juneau, Alaska), U.S.
 Bird Island (Kitnamax), part of the Aleutian Islands, Alaska, U.S.
 Bird Island, Lake Louise, Alaska, U.S.
 Bird Island (Marin County, California), U.S.
 Bird Island (San Mateo County, California), U.S.
 Bird Island, Brooks Island Regional Preserve, California, U.S.

Bird Island (Pearl and Hermes Atoll), Hawaii, U.S.
Bird Island, or Moku Manu, Hawaii, U.S.
Bird Island, or Nihoa, Hawaii, U.S.
 Bird Island (Massachusetts), U.S.
 Bird Island, Minnesota, U.S.
 Bird Island Township, Renville County, Minnesota, U.S.
 Bird Island (Montana), an island in Montana, U.S.
 Bird Island, North Carolina, U.S.
 Bird Island, Harris Beach State Park, Oregon, U.S.
 Isla de Aves (Spanish, 'Island of Birds'), a Caribbean dependency of Venezuela

Oceania
 Bird Island Nature Reserve, New South Wales, Australia
 Bird Islands (Queensland), Australia
 Bird Island, Whitsunday Islands, Queensland, Australia
 Bird Island in the Port River estuary north of Adelaide, South Australia
 Bird Islands Conservation Park, Spencer Gulf, South Australia, Australia
 Bird Island (Tasmania), Australia
 Bird Island (Prime Seal Group), Tasmania, Australia
 Bird Island (Western Australia), the name of three islands
 Bird Island, or Nihoa, Hawaii, U.S.
 Bird Island, Palmyra Atoll, Line Islands

Elsewhere
 Bird Island, Falkland Islands
 Bird Island, South Georgia
 Bird Islands, Qinghai Lake, China
 Tori-shima (Izu Islands), (Japanese, 'Bird Island'), Japan

Other uses
Bird Island (radio series)
 Bird Island, a fictional island in the Angry Birds films

See also

 Bird Key and Bird Key (Miami), islands in Florida, U.S. 
 Bird Rock (disambiguation)